James Robert Kirkland (February 15, 1903 – February 25, 1958) was a United States district judge of the United States District Court for the District of Columbia.

Education and career

Born in Wilmington, Delaware, Kirkland received an Artium Baccalaureus degree from George Washington University in 1927, a Bachelor of Laws from George Washington University Law School in 1928, and a Master of Laws from the same institution in 1929. He received a Bachelor of Commercial Science degree from Benjamin Franklin University (merged into George Washington University in 1987) in 1930. Kirkland served as an Assistant United States Attorney in Washington, D.C. from 1929 to 1934, then entered private practice in Washington, D.C. from 1934 to 1949. In 1936 he was on active duty serving aboard the U.S.S. Quincy evacuating American citizens from the Spanish Civil War.  He served as counsel to the United States Senate Committee on the District of Columbia from 1947 to 1949. He was also served as a United States Naval Reserve Commander.

Federal judicial service

Kirkland received a recess appointment from President Harry S. Truman on October 21, 1949, to the United States District Court for the District of Columbia, to a new seat authorized by 63 Stat. 493. He was nominated to the same position by President Truman on January 5, 1950. He was confirmed by the United States Senate on March 8, 1950, and received his commission on March 9, 1950. His service terminated on February 25, 1958, due to his death in Wilmington.

References

Sources
 

1903 births
1958 deaths
George Washington University alumni
Judges of the United States District Court for the District of Columbia
United States district court judges appointed by Harry S. Truman
20th-century American judges
United States Navy officers
20th-century American lawyers
George Washington University Law School alumni
Assistant United States Attorneys